Dorylaimida (dorylaims) is a diverse order of nematodes with both soil and freshwater species.

Taxonomy

History 
The order originated with the description of Dorylaimus stagnalis by Dujardin in 1845, and in 1876 De MAn proposed the family Dorylamidae, while Cobb added many other genera and subgenera. In 1927 Filipjev added a subfamily, Dorylaiminae, and by 1934 there were four subfamilies. That was when Thorne raised family Dorylaimidae to superfamily Dorylaimoidea. In 1936 Pearse raised it further to become a suborder of Enoplida, and in 1942 Pearse proposed the current order, Dorylaimida to encompass all of the dorylaim nematodes. Many reorganisations followed. For instance Clark (1961) did not accept Dorylaimida, whereas Goodey (1963) did. Other reclassifications include Jairajpuri (1964, 1969, 1976, 1980, 1983, 1992), Thorne (1964, 1967), Siddiqui (1968, 1983), Andrássy (1969, 1976), and Coomans and Loof (1970).  The scheme shown here is that of Jairajpuri (1992), which excludes the mononchs, alaims (Alaimida) and diphtherophorids (Triplonchida).

With the advent of molecular phylogenetic analysis, a further reorganisation has been necessary.

Subdivision 
The families of order Dorylaimida are divided into three suborders and a number of superfamilies:

 Suborder Dorylaimina Pearse, 1942 (Type Suborder)
 Superfamily Dorylaimoidea de Man, 1876
 Family Actinolaimidae
 Family Aporcelaimidae
 Family Dorylaimidae
 Family Longidoridae
 Family Nordiidae
 Family Qudsianematidae
 Superfamily Belondiroidea Throne, 1939
 Family Belondiridae
 Superfamily Tylencholaimoidea Filipjev, 1934
 Family Aulolaimoididae
 Family Leptonchidae
 Family Mydonomidae
 Family Tylencholaimidae
 Suborder Nygolaimina Thorne, 1935
 Superfamily Nygolaimoidea
 Family Aetholaimidae
 Family Nygellidae
 Family Nygolaimellidae 
 Family Nygolaimidae
 Suborder Campydorina Jairajpuri, 1983
 Superfamily Campydoroidea
 Family Campydoroidae

References

Bibliography 

Enoplia
Nematode orders